2003 Emmy Awards may refer to:

 55th Primetime Emmy Awards, the 2003 Emmy Awards ceremony honoring primetime programming June 2002 – May 2003
 30th Daytime Emmy Awards, the 2003 Emmy Awards ceremony honoring daytime programming during 2002
 31st International Emmy Awards, honoring international programming

Emmy Award ceremonies by year